The 1951-52 Scottish National League season was the 14th season of the Scottish National League, the top level of ice hockey in Scotland at the time. Seven teams participated in the league, and the Ayr Raiders won the championship.

Regular season

References

Scot
ice hockey
ice hockey